Thomas Brooks Fletcher (October 10, 1879 – July 1, 1945) was a U.S. Representative from Ohio.

Born in Mechanicstown, Ohio, Fletcher attended the public schools, a private school at Augusta, Ohio, and the Richard School of Dramatic Art in Cleveland.
He graduated from Mount Union College, Alliance, Ohio, in 1900.
He was editor of the Daily Leader, Alliance, Ohio, from 1903 to 1905.
He served on the staff of the Morning News, Canton, Ohio, from 1905 to 1906.
He became a Redpath lecturer in 1906.
He was editor and publisher of the Daily Tribune at Marion, Ohio, from 1910 to 1922.

Fletcher was elected as a Democrat to the Sixty-ninth and Seventieth Congresses (March 4, 1925 – March 3, 1929).
He was an unsuccessful candidate for reelection in 1928 to the Seventy-first Congress.

Fletcher was elected to the Seventy-third, Seventy-fourth, and Seventy-fifth Congresses (March 4, 1933 – January 3, 1939).
He served as chairman of the Committee on Election of President, Vice President, and Representatives (Seventy-fourth and Seventy-fifth Congresses), Committee on the Census (Seventy-fifth Congress).
He was an unsuccessful candidate for reelection in 1938 to the Seventy-sixth Congress and for election in 1942 to the Seventy-eighth Congress.
He resumed lecturing and chautauqua work.
He died in Washington, D.C., July 1, 1945.
He was interred in Mechanicstown Cemetery, Mechanicstown, Ohio.

Sources

1879 births
1945 deaths
People from Marion, Ohio
People from Carroll County, Ohio
University of Mount Union alumni
Democratic Party members of the United States House of Representatives from Ohio